This is a complete discography of the Finnish rock band Hanoi Rocks. The band have released eight studio albums throughout their career and sold approximately 1 million records worldwide.

Albums

Studio albums

Live albums

Compilations 
 Million Miles Away (1984) (Japan only) (Japan: 3,930)
 Up Around the Bend, Super Best (1984) (Japan only)
 The Best of Hanoi Rocks (1985)
 Dead by Christmas (1986)
 The Collection (1989)
 Tracks from a Broken Dream (1990) (Japan: 11,370)
 Story (1990) (Japan only) (Japan: 3,810)
 Strange Boys Play Weird Openings 4-CD Box Set (1992) (Japan only)
 Lean On Me (1992) (Japan: 12,020)
 All Those Glamorous Years...Best of Hanoi Rocks & Michael Monroe (1996) (Japan only)
 Decadent, Dangerous, Delicious (2000)
 Hanoi Rocks 4-CD Box Set (2001)
 Up Around the Bend...The Definitive Collection (2004)
 Lightning Bar Blues – The Albums 1981–1984 (2005)
 This One's for Rock'n'roll – The Best of Hanoi Rocks 1980–2008 (2008)
 Ripped Off – Odd Tracks and Demos (2009) (Japan only)
 Strange Boys (2016)
 Mental Beat 1980–1985 (2016)

Singles

References

External links 
 Discography on the official Hanoi Rocks website
 Discography on the first Hanoi Rocks Website

Hanoi Rocks
Discographies of Finnish artists
Rock music group discographies